Uzbekistan competed at the 1998 Winter Olympics in Nagano, Japan.

Alpine skiing

Men

Figure skating

Tatyana Malinina placed eighth in ladies figure skating and Roman Skornyakow placed nineteenth in men's.

Men

Women

Freestyle skiing

Women

References 
 sports-reference

External links 
 Official Olympic Reports

Nations at the 1998 Winter Olympics
1998
Winter Olympics